Linda Wilscam (born 1949) is a Canadian actor, educator and writer. She performed in the Radio Canada television series  during the 1970s.

The daughter of Maurice Wilscam and Gabrielle Arsenault, she graduated from the Conservatoire d'art dramatique de Montréal in 1971. Wilscam created the character Picotine for summer theatre; she then adapted the character for television and appeared in the series of the same name from 1971 to 1976. She went on to teach theatre at McGill University and then taught at the Cégep de Sainte-Thérèse. In 1995, she began teaching at the Cégep de Saint-Hyacinthe.

She wrote a number of novels based on the Picotine television series:
 Picotine et l’Homme aux Ballons
 Picotine et le bout du monde
 Picotine et le Prince des vents

References

External links 
 

1949 births
Living people
Writers from Quebec
Actresses from Quebec
Canadian women children's writers
Academic staff of McGill University